Neogene corumbensis is a moth of the  family Sphingidae. It is found in Argentina and Bolivia.

The forewings are 23 mm long in males and 25 mm in females. It is mainly brown.

References

Neogene (moth)
Moths described in 1922